Apache Junction is a 2021 Thai-American Western action adventure crime film written and directed by Justin Lee and starring Stuart Townsend, Trace Adkins, Scout Taylor-Compton and Thomas Jane.

Cast
Stuart Townsend as Jericho Ford
Scout Taylor-Compton as Annabelle Angel
Trace Adkins as Captain Hensley
Ed Morrone as Oslo Pike
Victoria Pratt as Christine Williams
Thomas Jane as Al Longfellow

Release
The film was released on September 24, 2021.

Reception
Joe Leydon of Variety gave the film a positive review and wrote, "Stuart Townsend and Scout Taylor-Compton are well-cast as archetypical Western characters while Trace Adkins again demonstrates commanding on-screen presence."

References

External links
 
 

2020s English-language films